Oppera is an American pop duo consisting of singer Martika and her musician husband Michael Mozart. They began recording together in 2003 and released their first album, Violince, in 2004. A co-headlining tour in support of the album occurred that year with singer Pat Benatar and her husband Neil Giraldo.

In 2005, they released a second album titled Oppera and toured Borders Books locations.

A website was set up and an online fan club called Aria 51 was formed. They were both taken down in December 2007 with the promise of a revamped site, but as of March 2020, they haven't reappeared.

In June 2009, it was announced that the duo, now going by the stage names Michael Daemon and Vita Edit, had produced and were starring in a web-based television series called j8ded, which centers around a fictional rock band from the UK. According to the website, this band was "thrown out of England" and "their possessions and monies are frozen" through a "monumental mistake". The duo heads to the US to try to rebuild their careers.

Discography
Albums
 Violince (2004)
 Oppera (2005)

References

External links
 Martika's official website

American pop music groups
American musical duos
Married couples